The Power Stage (abbreviated as PS) is a special stage that usually runs as the final stage of a rally in the World Rally Championship (WRC). Additional championship points are available to the fastest five crews through the stage regardless of where they actually finished in the rally. Unlike normal special stages, which are timed to a tenth of a second, the timing of the Power Stage is to a thousandth of a second.

Power Stages were also introduced during the 2022 European Rally Championship, using the final stage of each rally and awarding points to the five fastest crews in a similar fashion to the WRC.

Points scoring systems
The bonus scoring system was once used at the 1999 Tour de Corse and 1999 Rally Finland. Re-introduced in 2011, the top three crews through the stage could score extra bonus points, with the fastest crew receiving three points, the second-fastest receiving two points, and the third-fastest receiving one point. In , the scoring system was amended so the five fastest drivers through the stage were awarded points from five for first to one for fifth. Manufacturers, WRC-2 and WRC-3 categories were also eligible to score Power Stage points in 2021. From 2022, WRC-2 awarded Power Stage points from three for first place, to one for third place. Power Stage points are no longer awarded in WRC-3.

Cancelled Power Stages
This list does not include cancelled rallies.

WRC Winners

By drivers

By co-drivers

WRC Point scorers

By drivers

By co-drivers

Most WRC Power Stage wins per season

Most WRC Power Stage points per season

Gallery

Notes

References

External links

 
 

Rally racing
World Rally Championship